Salih Fazlić (born 25 August 1975) is a Bosnian volleyball player at the highest national level.

He played for Bosnia's most successful volleyball club OK Kakanj in the teams that won the Premier League of Volleyball of Bosnia and Herzegovina national championship six times (2000, 2001, 2003, 2004, 2005, 2008) and the National Cup of Bosnia and Herzegovina 9 times (1994, 1995, 1996, 1997, 2001, 2002, 2003, 2004, 2006), achieving the national league and cup-winning double three times.

Salih spent his entire professional career at OK Kakanj(1994–2008)and was a team captain in 2000.

He played mainly as middle-blocker/hitter, but also played as libero and spiker.

He is coach of the OK Kakanj women's team.

References

1975 births
Living people
Bosnia and Herzegovina men's volleyball players
People from Kakanj